shock/denial/anger/acceptance is the 13th studio album by Rick Springfield. Released on 24 February 2004, it also includes a limited edition package, which contains a CD of unreleased music and demos from previous albums and a DVD of interviews and videos.

Track listing

Personnel
Rick Springfield - lead vocals, guitars
John Billings - bass
David Whiston - guitars
Derek Hilland - keyboards
Rodger Carter - drums

Charts

References

External links
 Rick Springfield official website

2004 albums
Rick Springfield albums